Meikle Loch is an inland loch some miles north of Collieston, Aberdeenshire, Scotland. It is designated as part of the Ythan Estuary complex, along with the  Sands of Forvie, as a Special Protection Area for wildlife conservation purposes. Meikle is a Scots word for large/big, which the loch is when compared to the adjacent Little Loch.

It is a eutrophic loch with limited aquatic vegetation but is important as the home to overwintering pink-footed geese.  Additionally, it is an essential breeding location for three species of tern during the summer months and houses a tremendous variety of reedswamp plants.

References

External links 
Special Protection Area designation at the Joint Nature Conservation Committee

PDF Review of Meikle Loch, 2002

Protected areas of Aberdeenshire
Special Protection Areas in Scotland
Ramsar sites in Scotland